The Old Town Hall is a building on Church Street in the market town of Poulton-le-Fylde in Lancashire, England. The building, which is located just beyond the northern end of Market Place, started life as a public house before becoming a municipal building and then reverting to use as a public house.

History

The first municipal building in the town was a building known as the Moot Hall, which stood at the southern end of the adjacent Market Place, just in front of the market cross, in late medieval times. Following significant population growth, particularly after the harbours on the River Wyre were developed, the area became an urban district in 1900. The new civic leaders originally held their meetings in a variety of places, but after finding this arrangement unsatisfactory, they decided to establish a dedicated meeting place. The site they selected had originally been developed as the Bay Horse Inn in 1869.

The Bay Horse Inn had been rebuilt in redbrick with stone dressings, to a Victorian style design, in 1910, seemingly dropping the inn part of the name, around that time. The design involved a symmetrical main frontage of three bays facing onto Church Street. The ground floor was slightly recessed in relation to the upper floors and featured a central doorway which was flanked by pilasters surmounted by brackets supporting the upper floors of the building. The central bay was fenestrated by a single casement window on the first floor and a small Diocletian window at attic level. The outer bays were fenestrated by bay windows with stone surrounds on the ground floor and by pairs of casement windows on the upper floors; the outer bays were surmounted Tudor style half-timbered gables. The council acquired the building in 1927 and converted the interior for use as council offices at that time.

The building continued to serve as the headquarters of Poulton-le-Fylde Urban District Council for much of the 20th century, and then briefly served as the meeting place of the enlarged Wyre Borough Council after it was formed in 1974; however, the building ceased to be the local seat of government in 1988, when the council relocated to the former Poulton Teacher Training College in Breck Road, which was converted for use as Wyre Civic Centre. The building in Church Street was converted back to its former use, as a public house, and was renamed the "Old Town Hall" at that time. It was extensively refurbished in 2012.

In 2008, Wyre Council's Poulton-le-Fylde Conservation Area Appraisal included the property for its historic value, but stated that, due to the many alterations made to it over time, it was unlikely that listed status would be achieved.

References

Buildings and structures in Poulton-le-Fylde
Government buildings completed in 1910
1910 establishments in England
City and town halls in Lancashire